Będlino  is a village in the administrative district of Gmina Wierzchowo, within Drawsko County, West Pomeranian Voivodeship, in north-western Poland. 

The village has a population of 197.

Notable residents
 Siegfried Engfer (1915-1946), Luftwaffe pilot

References

Villages in Drawsko County